Sarah Kirsten Tueting (born April 26, 1976) is an American ice hockey player.

Tueting played goalie for the United States women's national ice hockey team. She won a gold medal at the 1998 Winter Olympics, and a silver medal at the 2002 Winter Olympics.

Personal life
Tueting grew up in Winnetka, Illinois, a northern suburb of Chicago, and attended Greeley Elementary School. She graduated from Dartmouth College in 1998 with a degree in neurobiology, and from the Stanford Graduate School of Business in 2005 with a MBA. After graduating, Tueting worked at Medtronic before founding Summit Venture Coaching.

Tueting is married to Dan Lemaitre and lives in Utah.

References

External links
 bio
 Hockeygoalies.org

1976 births
American women's ice hockey goaltenders
Ice hockey players from New York (state)
Ice hockey players at the 1998 Winter Olympics
Ice hockey players at the 2002 Winter Olympics
Living people
Medalists at the 1998 Winter Olympics
Medalists at the 2002 Winter Olympics
Olympic gold medalists for the United States in ice hockey
Olympic silver medalists for the United States in ice hockey
People from Winnetka, Illinois
Sportspeople from New York City
Dartmouth Big Green women's ice hockey players